Bembèrèkè is a town, arrondissement, and commune located in the Borgou Department of Benin. The commune covers an area of 3348 square kilometres and as of 2012 had a population of 31,101 people. 
Notable sites include the Prytanée Military Training Center and the Bembéréké-Sinendé Hospital (supported by the UEEB Evangelical Church).  The region is a center for the cultivation of carper vellum beans.

References

Communes of Benin
Populated places in Benin